The 2018–19 England Korfball League season is played with 10 teams. Trojans KC are the defending korfball champions.

Teams
The league will be played with 10 teams. The teams that have finished from 1st to 9th place as of 19 April 2018 in the 2017–18 season qualified for the 2018/19 season. The remaining place was filled by Bristol Thunder who won the Promotion Play-off.

Regular season table

References

England Korfball League
England
England
Korfball
Korfball